The 1948 NAIA basketball tournament was held in March at Municipal Auditorium in Kansas City, Missouri. The 11th annual NAIA basketball tournament featured 32 teams playing in a single-elimination format. 

The championship game featured Louisville beating Indiana State, 82–70.

The only school to have won national titles in both the NAIA and NCAA Division I is Louisville. Uniquely, Indiana State has finished as the National Runner-up in the NAIA (1946 and 1948), the NCAA Division I (1979) and the NCAA Division II (1968) tournaments. Indiana State won the NAIA in 1950.

The tournament was the first intercollegiate postseason to feature a black student-athlete, Clarence J. Walker of Indiana State under coach John Wooden. Wooden had withdrawn from the 1947 tournament because the NAIB would not allow Walker to play.

Awards and honors
Many of the records set by the 1948 tournament have been broken, and many of the awards were established much later:
Leading scorer est. 1963
Leading rebounder est. 1963
Charles Stevenson Hustle Award est. 1958
Coach of the Year est. 1954
Player of the Year est. 1994
All-time scoring leader; second appearance: Harold Haskins, 12th, Hamline (Minn.) (1947,48,49,50), 14 games, 104 field goals, 72 free throws, 280 total points, 20.0 average per game.

Bracket

  * denotes overtime.

See also
 1948 NCAA basketball tournament
 1948 National Invitation Tournament

References

NAIA Men's Basketball Championship
Tournament